Tusing Peak is a snow-capped peak (2,650 m) rising from the central portion of Mount Hartigan in the Executive Committee Range, Marie Byrd Land. Mapped by United States Geological Survey (USGS) from surveys and U.S. Navy trimetrogon photography, 1958–60. Named by Advisory Committee on Antarctic Names (US-ACAN) for Allen D. Tusing, meteorologist at Byrd Station, 1959.

Mountains of Marie Byrd Land
Executive Committee Range